The Dublin Hebrew Congregation is the Jewish community in Dublin, Republic of Ireland.

History
The Terenure Hebrew Congregation was established at a meeting on 26 September 1936. The community aimed to provide services for members in the areas of Rathgar, Rathmines, and Terenure. The congregation rented rooms at 6 Grosvenor Place, Rathmines. In April 1940, the congregation purchased 52 Grosvenor Road. At Rosh Hashanah in 1948, the group moved to a Nissen hut at “Leoville”, Rathfarnham Road, Terenure, which had been donated to the congregation by Woulfe Freedman and violinist Erwin Goldwater. Construction of a new synagogue began in August 1952 and was dedicated on 30 August 1953. The Nissen hut became a function hall.

Merger
In January 1999, the Terenure Congregation and the Adelaide Road Congregation held extraordinary general meetings (EGMs) at which the members of both congregations agreed to begin the process of merging the congregations. The Adelaide Road Synagogue was sold and some proceeds of the sale were used to build a new mikveh and synagogue complex on the Terenure property. On 15 December 2004, the congregations held simultaneous EGMs and agreed to a complete merger. On 25 January 2005, the Dublin Hebrew Congregation held its first council meeting..
The synagogue is located at 32a Rathfarnham Road, Dublin.

Fire
On 9 February 1966, the synagogue was set on fire. The synagogue was severely damaged and several Siffrei Torah were destroyed. The Nissen hut was converted back into a synagogue so that no Shabbat Services would be missed. On 26 May 1968, the congregation opened and dedicated the refurbished synagogue.

Burial grounds
Ballybough Cemetery, built in 1718, is the oldest Jewish cemetery in Ireland. As it reached capacity in the late 1800s, it was replaced by the current cemetery in Dolphin's Barn.  The new cemetery was established in 1898 by Robert Bradlaw who raised £300 in donations to set up a new chevra kadisha.

See also
History of the Jews in Ireland

References

External links
Dublin Hebrew Congregation Official website

Jews and Judaism in Dublin (city)
Synagogues in the Republic of Ireland
Jewish Irish history